Vijith Shetty (born 1981) is an Indian football player. He is currently playing for Air India FC in the I-League in as a midfielder.

External links
 goal.com
 

Indian footballers
1981 births
Living people
I-League players
Air India FC players
Association football midfielders